Lee Kyu-ro (born August 20, 1988) is a South Korean football player who plays as a defender who plays for Gimpo FC of K League 2.

Career

International career
On 9 January 2010, Lee made his first international cap for South Korea at the friendly match against Zambia.

Personal life 
On 21 December 2014, Lee married former Nine Muses member Bini after dating for two years.

Honours

Club
Chunnam Dragons
FA Cup Winner : 2007

FC Seoul
K League 1 Winner : 2010
League Cup Winner : 2010

Jeonbuk Hyundai Motors
K League 1 Winner : 2014, 2015

References

External links
 
 
 

1988 births
Living people
South Korean footballers
Association football fullbacks
South Korea international footballers
Jeonnam Dragons players
FC Seoul players
Incheon United FC players
Jeonbuk Hyundai Motors players
Seoul E-Land FC players
Pocheon Citizen FC players
Gimpo FC players
K League 1 players
K League 2 players
K3 League players
K3 League (2007–2019) players
Sportspeople from North Jeolla Province